Lachhi is a 1949 Punjabi film. The film was a big hit and a commercial success. 

Hansraj Behl composed the music and Mulk Raj Bhakhri penned the lyrics. 

Mohammad Rafi, Lata Mangeshkar and Shamshad Begum, S.Balbir are the lead playback singers. 
Its songs, naale lammi te naale kaali, ve channa raat judaaian wali sung by Lata Mangeshkar, and meri laggdi kise na vekhi, te tuttdi nu jagg jaanda sung by Shamshad Begum, were big hits. A duet, kali kanghi naal kale waal paee wahuniaan sung by Lata and Rafi, was also a hit.

See also 
Do Lachhian
Bhangra

References 

1949 films
Indian black-and-white films
Films set in Punjab, India
Punjabi-language Indian films
1940s Punjabi-language films